Christian Ouellet (April 22, 1934 – December 21, 2021) was a Canadian politician from the province of Quebec. He represented Brome—Missisquoi in the House of Commons of Canada from 2006 to 2011 as a member of the Bloc Québécois.

He is not to be confused with another Christian Ouellet, who has worked as an organizer and policy strategist for the Quebec Liberal Party.

Early life and career
Ouellet was born in Montreal on April 22, 1934. An architect by profession, he joined the Ordre des architectes du Québec in 1969 and took a Master's Degree in building from the University of Manchester in England (1972–75). He has promoted ecological housing since 1973 and was a finalist for the Canada Mortgage and Housing Corporation's Healthy Housing Design Competition in 1991.

Ouellet chaired the Solar Energy Society of Canada and the Parti Québécois's national committee on Environment and Sustainable Development. He taught architecture at the Université de Montréal and lectured at the Université du Québec à Montréal.

Political career
Ouellet was active with the Bloc Québécois and its provincial counterpart, the Parti Québécois, before running for office himself. He first sought election to the House of Commons in the 2004 federal election and finished a close second against incumbent Liberal cabinet minister Denis Paradis in Brome—Missisquoi. He challenged Paradis again in the 2006 election and won by over five thousand votes.

During the 2006 election, Ouellet said that he would downplay Quebec sovereigntism if elected and would instead focus on tackling economic issues and opposing corruption. Bloc leader Gilles Duceppe criticized this statement, saying that his party would promote sovereignty as well as defending Quebec's interests in other areas. After talking with Duceppe, Ouellet agreed to support the Bloc's full platform on sovereignty.

Ouellet was re-elected in the 2008 federal election, defeating Paradis by a reduced margin in a rematch from 2006.

In parliament, Ouellet served as the Bloc's critic for social housing and as an associate critic for natural resources and the environment. He has also promoted increased Via Rail access from Montreal to Sherbrooke via Quebec's Estrie. In 2009, he introduced a Private Member's Bill to remove waiting times for Employment Insurance benefits.

Ouellet was one of eight Canadian parliamentarians to meet with Chen Shui-bian, the president of Taiwan, in 2006.

On February 24, 2011, the Bloc announced that Ouellet would not be a candidate in the next federal election.

Personal life and death
Ouellet died on December 21, 2021, at the age of 87.

Electoral record

References

External links
 
 Bloc Québécois biography

1934 births
2021 deaths
21st-century Canadian politicians
Bloc Québécois MPs
French Quebecers
Members of the House of Commons of Canada from Quebec
People from Magog, Quebec
Politicians from Montreal